Mono No Aware  is a compilation album of ambient songs by various artists, released by the Berlin-based record label PAN. Titled after the Japanese term of the same name, meaning "the pathos of things" or "an empathy towards things", Mono No Aware features previously unreleased tracks by artists under the PAN label, including Yves Tumor and Jeff Witscher.

Release
Mono No Aware was first released on vinyl record as a "special art edition" at the Los Angeles Art Book Fair in February 2017, limited to 100 copies. The album later received a general release on physical and digital media on 17 March 2017.

Reception

Mark Richardson of Pitchfork gave the album a positive review, writing that "Each piece of the 80-minute compilation has its own unique identity, yet together it feels like the work of one mind." Crack Magazines Tom Watson, in his review of the album, wrote that, "Often, mono no aware achieves something transcendental with music that is hypnotic, diverse and tenebrous but clearly forged by the sensitive hands of humans"; Watson concludes by calling it "a Spirograph of uniquely experimental artists merging together to create something even more beguiling. A truly arresting listen."

Jake Witz of NPR praised Yves Tumor's track "Limerence", calling it "a heartbreaking look at how mono no aware transpires within the context of a romantic relationship." Witz commended the track's use of audio samples of romantic partners in a home video as "a haunting ceremony", and wrote that, "mono no aware is painful, but only if you see the past and present as disconnected worlds. By fusing decayed recordings with modern ambience, "Limerence" transforms death from a negative experience into a universal bond of empathy."

Track listing

Personnel
Production
 Rashad Becker – mastering

References

PAN (record label) albums
2017 albums
Ambient compilation albums